FlingSmash is an action video game developed by Artoon and published by Nintendo for the Wii. It was announced on Nintendo's press site on June 2, 2009, during E3 2009. The game requires the use of the Wii MotionPlus peripheral. Nintendo introduced the Wii Remote Plus, a variation of the Wii Remote with features of the MotionPlus, which is bundled with the game. It was released in November 2010 in North America, Europe, and Japan. The game borrows heavily from the paddleball concept and consists of players using the Wii Remote to hit the character, Zip, towards obstacles and collectable items.

Plot
The game is set on the fictional Suthon Island. It is said to hold the power to protect the world from harm, which was protected by a large palm tree and watched over by the nature spirits in the island. Before the game, the antagonist, Omminus, takes over the island in order to rule the world. As a result, the palm tree begins to wither and the princess becomes ill. The leader of the nature spirits recalls an old legend about a hero using sacred pearls to restore the peace. He finds the treasure chest where the hero, Zip, resides. Zip, and a friend from the neighboring Eesturn Island, Pip, set out to retrieve the pearls and defeat Omminus.

Gameplay

Worlds and stages
The game consists of eight worlds, each of which consists of three levels. In each level, the screen will scroll constantly in one direction. The direction depends on the stage and Wii Remote Hand. Players must collect a pearl to complete the level. To collect a pearl, players will need to find three medals. Medals are hidden within each stage, and are sometimes carried by enemies that the player must hit. If the player falls back to the edge of the screen for too long, he/she will get eaten by Hydracoil, and will lose a life. If the player loses all of his/her lives, the game is over. If the players collects a pearl in all three levels, a boss stage is unlocked in each world. The world is cleared after the player beats the boss.

Mini-games
If the player gets an A ranking in all three stages of a specific world, a mini-game option will appear on the world's selection screen. Each mini-game shows instructions on how to play it. If playing with a friend, players will see a gold icon for a competitive game and a blue icon for cooperative play.

Reception
FlingSmash received "generally unfavorable" reviews, according to Metacritic, receiving a score of 48/100.

Notes

References

External links
Flingsmash Official website (United States)

2010 video games
Action video games
Nintendo games
Video games developed in Japan
Wii games
Wii MotionPlus games
Wii-only games
Side-scrolling video games
Video games with 2.5D graphics
Paddle-and-ball video games
Video games about size change
Multiplayer and single-player video games
Artoon games
Video games scored by Mariko Nanba
Video games scored by Yutaka Minobe